The Prado River is a small river near Jaborandi in the Brazilian state of São Paulo. It flows northwards to become a southern tributary of the Grande River.

Rivers of São Paulo (state)